Murach may refer to:

 Michael Murach (1911–1941), German amateur welterweight boxer
 Heinz Murach (1926–2007), German football coach
 Murach (Schwarzach), a river of Bavaria, Germany, tributary of the Schwarzach
 Niedermurach, a municipality in the district of Schwandorf in Bavaria, Germany